XHRE-FM/XERE-AM is a combo radio station in Celaya, Guanajuato. Owned by Grupo ACIR, XHRE/XERE broadcasts on 88.1 FM and 920 AM and carries a grupera format known as La Comadre.

History
Rafael Sandoval Aguilar built and signed on XERE-AM at 1290 kHz from Salvatierra on September 19, 1968. Broadcasting with 250 watts, XERE was the first station in Salvatierra, joined less than two years later by a competitor, XEFAC-AM on 1380 kHz. In the 1970s and 1980s, it increased its power, and in 1994, it received its FM combo station; by this time, XERE had moved from Salvatierra to Celaya. The station was sold to Grupo ACIR not long after.

References

Regional Mexican radio stations
Radio stations in Guanajuato
Celaya
Grupo ACIR
1969 establishments in Mexico